Kuttiar Weir (Malayalam: കുട്ടിയാർ തടയണ) is a small diversion dam constructed across Kuttiar River in Elappara panchayath of Vagamon Village of Idukki District in Kerala, India. The Kuttiar weir is constructed for augmenting water to the Idukki Hydro Electric Project.

Narakakkanam, Azhutha, Vazhikkadavu, Vadakkepuzha and Kuttiar diversion schemes were later added to augment the Idukki reservoir. The Kuttiar diversion scheme envisages diversion of water from 10.4 km2 of catchment of Kuttiar ar to Idukki reservoir by constructing an unlined tunnel of 2697.3 m length and a weir of 101.30 m long for an additional 37 Mu power generation at Idukki Power station.

Specifications

References 

Dams in Kerala
Dams completed in 2009